Gulnaz is a given name. Notable people with the name include:

 Gulnaz (Afghani)
 Gulnaz Badykova (born 1994), Russian cyclist